John Michael McKenzie (1955 – 10 May 2020) was a British bass guitarist who was a member of bands such as Global Village Trucking Company and Man.  He played on numerous singles, notably for Eurythmics, The Pretenders and Alison Moyet; and was a touring musician with acts as diverse as Lionel Richie, Dr. John and the Royal Philharmonic Orchestra.

Career
McKenzie started his career in 1970 as a member of the Global Village Trucking Company, who all lived together in an old farm house in Sotherton, Suffolk, with their families, and became a well-known live act by playing extended jams at numerous benefit concerts and free festivals. Their first recording was as part of Greasy Truckers Live at Dingwalls Dance Hall, a benefit album recorded at Dingwalls and released in 1973.  The same year, the BBC made and broadcast a documentary about the band, their commune, and their shunning of record companies. In 2008 the BBC made a follow-up documentary for their What Happened Next series, which included the band performing a reunion gig, their first in over 30 years, which led to Global Village gigs at Glastonbury 2008 and other festivals. In 1975 they recorded an eponymous album, but broke up shortly afterwards.

McKenzie came to prominence as the bass player of the rock band Man, which he joined in 1975, having auditioned for the role. He recorded The Welsh Connection for which he also wrote one track, and which reached No 40 in the UK Album Chart. During a US tour to promote the album, including performances with John Cipollina, in July/August 1976, differences between the band members arose, and on the next European tour McKenzie and Phil Ryan announced they would be leaving. However, they remained together for a farewell tour, on which a live album,  All's Well That Ends Well, was recorded at the Roundhouse in December 1976.

He then played on records of artists like Annette Peacock, Steve Hillage and Noel McCalla.

The 1980s saw him playing on records by Bob Young, Shusha Guppy, Wham!, Deke Leonard, Morrissey-Mullen, Claire Hamill, Space Monkey, Jim Diamond, Bob Dylan, Al Corley, The Pretenders, Jeffrey Lee Pierce, Microdisney, Five Star, Endgames (with Mel Gaynor), Atomic Rooster's John Mizarolli.  He played on three Eurythmics hit singles "Thorn in My Side", "When Tomorrow Comes" and "The Miracle of Love". He also was featured on the soundtrack of the movie La Boum 2 and on albums including Gary Moore, Ian Paice, Jaki Graham, Don Airey, Richard Bailey, Peter Auty, Billy Bremner, Terry Stannard, Simon Kirke, Earl Slick, Graham Lyle and Chris Thompson. He also produced singles along with Candy McKenzie and Mel Gaynor. In 1984, he produced the LP Spell It Out, songs recorded by his father Mike McKenzie, and mother, the actress Elizabeth McKenzie.

In 1990, he played on The Pretenders' hit single "Hold a Candle to This", Alison Moyet's "It Won't Be Long" (and the album Hoodoo) and played on records by Patti Austin, Latin Quarter, Roxy Music's Phil Manzanera, Moyet's Essex, Matt Bianco, Pete Brown, Helen Watson and Kevin Rowland which later led to McKenzie playing for Dexys Midnight Runners. He also played on the UK hit single "You Better Believe It" by Sid Owen and Patsy Palmer for Children in Need.

McKenzie also produced the record Rattlesnake Guitar: The Music of Peter Green featuring Ian Anderson, Arthur Brown, Rory Gallagher, Gregg Bissonette, Stuart Hamm, Luther Grosvenor, Dick Heckstall-Smith, Ken Hensley, Max Middleton, Zoot Money, Billy Sheehan, Bob Tench, Snowy White, Roy Z, John "Rabbit" Bundrick, Savoy Brown and many more. His 1991 performance with Seal was released on DVD, entitled Live at the Point, in 2004. In 2005 he was featured on Roots Manuva's "The Falling". He also played on records by Bond, Antigone Foster, Jim Diamond, Kokomo, Paddy Casey, Louis Philippe, Wet Wet Wet's Marti Pellow and on East 17's UK hit single "Secret of My Life" in 2011.

He toured the world as a musician for Lionel Richie, Shakira, David Bowie, Tina Turner, Eric Burdon, Kajagoogoo, Dr. John, Johnny Mathis, Everything But The Girl, Todd Sharpville, Branford Marsalis, Rui Veloso, Tim Finn, Ive Mendes, Tom Scott, David Dundas, Danny Tenaglia, The Christians, Phenix Horns, Duran Duran's Andy Taylor, Jimmy Iovine, Dave Stewart, Wild, Leon Ware, Eternal, James Ingram, Francis Rossi, Soft Machine's Karl Jenkins, Albert Lee, Barbara Dickson, Davy Spillane, Charles Aznavour, Raw Stylus, Linda Taylor, Blair Cunningham, Andy Newmark, Teresa Teng, Annabel Lamb, Nadirah X, Bob Clearmountain, Mitchell Froom, Arthur Louis, as well as Royal Philharmonic Orchestra and Reggae Philharmonic Orchestra.

In 2012, he toured with Dexy's Midnight Runners including an appearance on Later with Jools Holland. In December 2013 McKenzie toured with classical crossover pianist Maksim Mrvica.

He died on 10 May 2020.

Discography
 1973 – Global Village Trucking Company – Greasy Truckers Live at Dingwalls Dance Hall
 1976 – Global Village Trucking Company – Global Village Trucking Company
 1976 – Man – The Welsh Connection
 1977 – Man – All's Well That Ends Well
 1978 – Iona – Cuckoo
 1979 – Annette Peacock – The Perfect Release
 1979 – Philip Rambow – Shooting Gallery
 1979 – Oxendale and Shepard – Put Your Money Where Your Mouth Is
 1979 – Steve Hillage – Open
 1979 – Noel McCalla – Night Time Emotion
 1979 – Steve Hillage – Live Herald
 1980 – Bob Young – In Quo Country
 1980 – Shusha – Here I Love You
 1981 – Deke Leonard – Before Your Very Eyes
 1982 – John Mizarolli – Message from the 5th Stone
 1982 – Morrissey–Mullen – Life on the Wire
 1983 – Royal Philharmonic Orchestra – Arrested
 1983 – Chris Thompson – Out of the Night
 1983 – Wham! – Fantastic
 1983 – Paul Brady – True For You
 1984 – Claire Hamill – Touch Paper
 1984 – Microdisney – Everybody Is Fantastic
 1985 – Five Star – Luxury of Life
 1985 – Jim Diamond – Double Crossed
 1985 – Jeffrey Lee Pierce – Wildweed
 1985 – Endgames – Natural
 1985 – Space Monkey – On The Beam
 1986 – Eurythmics – Revenge
 1986 – Bob Dylan – Knocked Out Loaded
 1986 – Al Corley – Riot of Colour
 1986 – Jim Diamond – Desire For Freedom
 1986 – The Pretenders – Get Close
 1986 – Wham! – Music from the Edge of Heaven
 1987 – Pulling Faces – Dance of Ghosts
 1989 – Tyrone Berkeley – To Touch You
 1989 – Phil Manzanera – Manzanera & McKay
 1990 – Mary Coughlan – Uncertain Pleasures
 1990 – The Pretenders – Packed!
 1991 – Alison Moyet – Hoodoo
 1991 – Steve Hillage – Ggggong-Go_Long
 1992 – Helen Watson – Companion Gal
 1992 – Faubert – Faubert
 1993 – Latin Quarter – Long Pig
 1994 – Patti Austin – That Secret Place
 1994 – Alison Moyet – Essex
 1995 – Matt Bianco – Gran Via
 1996 – Pete Brown – The Land That Cream Forgot
 1997 – Latin Quarter – Bringing Rosa Home
 1999 – Darkstar – Heart of Darkness
 1999 – Kevin Rowland – My Beauty
 2001 – Jim Diamond – Jim Diamond
 2002 – Bond – Shine
 2002 – Adam Snyder – Across The Pond
 2002 – Pete Brown & Phil Ryan – Ardours of the Lost Rake
 2003 – Louis Philippe – My Favorite Part of You
 2003 – Everything but the Girl – Like the Deserts Miss the Rain
 2004 – Kokomo – To Be Cool
 2004 – Paddy Casey – Living
 2005 – Danny Seward – Where My Heart Is
 2005 – Marti Pellow – Smile
 2005 – Roots Manuva – Awfully Deep
 2007 – Virginia Constantine – The Bumpy Road To Love
 2008 – The Explorers – Live at the Palace
 2009 – Antigone – AntigoneLand
 2010 – Pete Brown – Road of Cobras
 2010 – Cold River Lady – Better Late Than Never
 2012 – Amandine Bourgeois – Sans Amour Mon Amour

Compilation albums
 1994 – Steve Hillage – BBC Radio 1 Live
 1995 – Phil Manzanera – Manzanera Collection
 1999 – Man – Rare Man
 2004 – Steve Hillage – Live at Deeply Vale Festival '78
 2005 – Eurythmics – Boxed
 2005 – Man – Live at the Keystone, Berkeley, 9 August 1976
 2006 – The Pretenders – Pirate Radio
 2008 – The Gun Club – The Life & Times of Jeffrey Lee Pierce & The Gun Club
 2013 – Man – Many Man Are Called
 2013 – Bob Dylan – The Complete Audio Collection Vol. 1

Others
 1982 – La Boum 2
 1995 – Rattlesnake Guitar: The Music of Peter Green
 2000 – Peter Green Songbook
 2001 – Arabesque Zoudge
 2001 - David French - All The Difference

DVDs
 2001 – Bond – Live at the Royal Albert Hall
 2003 – Everything but the Girl – Like the Deserts Miss the Rain
 2003 – David Bowie – Inside Bowie & The Spiders
 2004 – Seal – Live at the Point
 2007 – Steve Hillage – Live in England 1979

References

External links
 Markbass Artist Page

British rock bass guitarists
Man (band) members
1955 births
2020 deaths
The Pretenders
People from Paddington